Kendriya Vidyalaya No. 1, AFS, Lohegaon, Pune is one of the Kendriya Vidyalayas across India. It is located at the Air Force Station, Lohegaon, Pune, India.

Overview 

The school's current principal is Mr. Umrakant Joshi . It has classes from I to XII, each with four divisions. The school has a football ground, two basketball courts, one assembly ground, one scout&guide ground, one volleyball ground, one cricket pitch and one children's park. The school is also known as Kendriya Vidyalaya no 1, Air Force Station, Pune.

Infrastructure 
Among the facilities are:
 Class rooms 43
 Science Labs 3
 Computer Labs 4
 Library 1
 Jr. Science Lab 1
 Resource Room (Primary wing) 1
 Resource room (Secondary wing) - under process
 Activity room 11
 Staff Room 2
 Music room 1
 SUPW Room 1
 Drawing Room 1
 Exam Room 1
 Geography Lab 1
 Game Room 1
 Football ground 1
 Basketball court 2
 Children's park 1

See also 
List of schools in Pune

References

External links 
 Official Website
 CBSE class XII results: Kendriya Vidyalayas put up good show

Schools in Pune
Kendriya Vidyalayas